St Mary Magdalene Church is a Church of England parish church in the village of Hart, County Durham, England. It was founded in 675 AD and is the oldest church in Hartlepool. The actual church itself is a Grade I listed building, with the tower dating back to the 13th century and the nave being from the 12th.

History 
The existence of a church on the current site can be dated as far back as 675 AD and is thought to have been a wood structure that was later replaced with stone to include a chancel and aisle-less nave.

References

External links 

12th-century church buildings in England
Church of England church buildings in County Durham
Grade I listed churches in County Durham
Buildings and structures in Hartlepool